Mike Russell (born 3 June 1969 in Middlesbrough, England), is a twelve-time WPBSA World Champion in the game of English billiards. He also has six IBSF World Billiards Championship titles standing to his name.

He has been described as an "archrival" of India's prodigy, Geet Sethi, an eight-time World Champion, and each of them had defeated the other for the title, with Russell victorious in 1996, and Sethi the winner in 1998, as of their next encounter at the 2007 event. Both scored two  apiece, but Russell knocked Sethi out in the semi-finals, 1835–1231, (65.5 vs. 45.6 average). Russell went on to win the title for the ninth time and a £6,000 prize, solidly beating Chris Shutt, 2166–1710 (52.8 vs. 42.8 avg.), with four double and four triple centuries to Shutt's four and none, respectively.

At the IBSF World Billiards Championships 2010, Russell not only claimed the 150up- and time-format title,  recorded a break of 1137 points in the time-format final.
Even though the amateur rules applied in this tournament do not include the "Baulk line rule" used in professional events, he is only the fourth player ever to score a break of over 1000 in an official match under modern rules.

Personal life

He has a son who is named Luke Russell who was born on 21 July 1996. He studied in England then shifted to India to the British International School and has now moved back to England. He has an elder son named Karl who is 21 years old and is a former junior MMA champion. He is married to Ayesh Russell since 2010 and they reside in Qatar.

Mike Russell moved to Qatar where he acts as trainer for the QBSF (Qatar Billiards and Snooker Federation) since 2007.

References

External links

 Mike Russell bio at BillardsForum
 Time to hail Mike Russell, the king of billiards Article by John Inverdale in Daily Telegraph, 1 August 2007

1969 births
English players of English billiards
Living people
British emigrants to Qatar
World champions in English billiards
Sportspeople from Middlesbrough